Potiivka  is a village in the Zhytomyr Oblast (province) of northern Ukraine.

Sources 
 Site of this village

Villages in Zhytomyr Raion